William Stephen Ian Whitelaw, 1st Viscount Whitelaw,  (28 June 1918 – 1 July 1999) was a British Conservative Party politician who served in a wide number of Cabinet positions, most notably as Home Secretary from 1979 to 1983 and as de facto Deputy Prime Minister of the United Kingdom from 1979 to 1988. He was Deputy Leader of the Conservative Party from 1975 to 1991.

After the Conservative Party won an unexpected victory at the 1970 general election, Whitelaw was appointed as Leader of the House of Commons and Lord President of the Council by Prime Minister Edward Heath. After the suspension of the Stormont Parliament resulted in the imposition of direct rule, Whitelaw served as Secretary of State for Northern Ireland from 1972 to 1973. He also served under Heath as Secretary of State for Employment from 1973 to 1974 and as Chairman of the Conservative Party from 1974 to 1975. 

Whitelaw served Prime Minister Margaret Thatcher throughout her leadership of the Conservative Party as deputy party leader. He served as de facto Deputy Prime Minister between 1979 and 1988 and as Home Secretary from 1979 to 1983. He stepped down as a Member of Parliament at the 1983 general election, and was appointed as a Member of the House of Lords. He served as Leader of the House of Lords and Lord President of the Council from 1983 to 1988. He was a captain of The Royal and Ancient Golf Club of St Andrews.

Early life
Whitelaw was born in Edinburgh, Scotland, and raised at the family home, "Monklands", on Thurlow Road in Nairn. He never met his father, William Alexander Whitelaw, born 1892, a member of a Scottish family of the landed gentry, who died in 1919 after service in the Argyll and Sutherland Highlanders in the First World War, when his son was still a baby. Whitelaw was brought up by his mother, Helen, a daughter of Major-General Francis Russell of Aden, a local councillor in Nairn, and his paternal grandfather, William Whitelaw (1868–1946), of Gartshore, Dunbartonshire, an Old Harrovian who had been educated at Trinity College, Cambridge, a landowner, briefly Conservative MP for Perth, 1892–1895, and chairman of the London and North-Eastern Railway Company. One of his great-aunts by marriage, born Dorothy Sarah Disraeli, was the niece of former Prime Minister and author Benjamin Disraeli.

Whitelaw was educated first at Wixenford School, Wokingham, before passing the entrance exam to Winchester College. From there he went up to Trinity College, Cambridge, where he won a blue for golf and joined the Officer Training Corps. By chance he was in a summer camp in 1939 on the outbreak of the Second World War and was granted a regular, not wartime, commission in the British Army, in the Scots Guards, later serving in the 6th Guards Tank Brigade, a separate unit from the Guards Armoured Division. He commanded Churchill tanks in Normandy during the Second World War and during Operation Bluecoat in late July 1944. His was the first Allied unit to encounter German Jagdpanther tank destroyers, being attacked by three out of the twelve Jagdpanthers which were in Normandy.

The battalion's second-in-command was killed when his tank was hit in front of Whitelaw's eyes; Whitelaw succeeded to this position, holding it, with the rank of major, throughout the advance through the Netherlands into Germany and until the end of the war. He was awarded the Military Cross for his actions at Caumont; a photograph of Field-Marshal Bernard Montgomery pinning the medal to his chest appears in his memoirs. After the end of the war in Europe, Whitelaw's unit was to have taken part in the invasion of Japan, but the Pacific War ended before this. Instead he was posted to Palestine, before leaving the army in 1946 to take care of the family estates of Gartshore and Woodhall in Lanarkshire, which he inherited on the death of his grandfather.

Political career
Following early defeats as a candidate for the constituency of East Dunbartonshire in 1950 and 1951, Whitelaw was elected as Member of Parliament (MP) for Penrith and the Border at the 1955 general election and represented that constituency for 28 years. He held his first government posts under Harold Macmillan as a Lord of the Treasury (government whip) between 1961 and 1962 and then under Macmillan and Sir Alec Douglas-Home was Parliamentary Secretary to the Ministry of Labour between 1962 and 1964. After the Conservatives lost the 1964 election, Douglas-Home appointed Whitelaw as Opposition Chief Whip. He was sworn of the Privy Council in January 1967.

Heath government, 1970–1974
When the Conservatives returned to power in 1970 under Edward Heath, Whitelaw was made Lord President of the Council and Leader of the House of Commons, with a seat in the cabinet. Upon the imposition of direct rule in March 1972, he became the first Secretary of State for Northern Ireland, serving in that capacity until November 1973. During his time in Northern Ireland he introduced Special Category Status for paramilitary prisoners. He attempted to negotiate with the Provisional Irish Republican Army, meeting its Chief of Staff Seán Mac Stiofáin in July 1972. The talks ended in an agreement to change from a seven-day truce to an open-ended truce; however, this did not last long. As a briefing for prime minister Heath later noted, Whitelaw "found the experience of meeting and talking to Mr Mac Stíofáin very unpleasant". Mac Stiofáin in his memoir complimented Whitelaw, saying he was the only Englishman ever to pronounce his name in Irish correctly.

In 1973, Whitelaw left Northern Ireland—shortly before the Sunningdale Agreement was reached—to become Secretary of State for Employment, and confronted the National Union of Mineworkers over its pay demands. This dispute was followed by the Conservative Party losing the February 1974 general election. Also in 1974, Whitelaw became a Companion of Honour.

In opposition, 1974–1979
Soon after Harold Wilson's Labour Party returned to government, Heath appointed Whitelaw as deputy leader of the opposition and chairman of the Conservative Party. Following a second defeat in the October 1974 general election, during which Whitelaw had accused Wilson of going "round and round the country stirring up apathy", Heath was forced to call a leadership election in 1975. Whitelaw loyally refused to run against Heath; however, and to widespread surprise, Margaret Thatcher narrowly defeated Heath in the first round. Whitelaw stood in his place and lost convincingly against Thatcher in the second round. The vote polarised along right–left lines, with in addition the region, experience and education of the MP having their effects.

Whitelaw managed to maintain his position as deputy leader until the 1979 general election, when he was appointed Home Secretary. In an unofficial capacity, he also served as Deputy Prime Minister in Thatcher's new government.

Home Secretary, 1979–1983
Thatcher admired Whitelaw and appointed him Home Secretary in her first Cabinet, later writing of him "Willie is a big man in character as well as physically. He wanted the success of the Government which from the first he accepted would be guided by my general philosophy. Once he had pledged his loyalty, he never withdrew it". Thatcher was rumoured to have said that "every Prime Minister needs a Willie" and Whitelaw was seen as Thatcher's de facto Deputy Prime Minister between 1979 and 1988 (though he never formally held the office), to the extent that the then Cabinet Secretary, Robert Armstrong, said that had Thatcher been killed in the Brighton hotel bombing, he thought he would have advised Queen Elizabeth II to send for Whitelaw.

As home secretary, Whitelaw adopted a hard-line approach to law and order. He improved police pay and embarked upon a programme of extensive prison building. His four-year tenure in office, however, was generally perceived as a troubled one. His much vaunted "short, sharp shock" policy, whereby convicted young offenders were detained in secure units and subjected to quasi-military discipline, won approval from the public but proved expensive to implement. He was home secretary during the six-day Iranian Embassy siege in April–May 1980.

In March 1981, he approved Wolverhampton Metropolitan Borough Council's 14-day ban on political marches in the borough in response to a planned National Front demonstration there.

Inner city decay, unemployment and what was perceived at the time as heavy-handed policing of ethnic minorities (notably the application of what some called the "notorious" sus law) sparked major riots in London, Liverpool, Birmingham and Leeds, and a spate of disturbances elsewhere. The Provisional IRA escalated its bombing campaign in England.

He contemplated resigning after an intruder broke into the Queen's bedroom in 1982 but was dissuaded from doing so. "We couldn't do without Willie," Margaret Thatcher reflected in later years. "He was a wonderful person."

Leader of the House of Lords, 1983–1988
Two days following the 1983 general election, Whitelaw received a hereditary peerage (the first created for 18 years) as Viscount Whitelaw, of Penrith in the County of Cumbria. Thatcher appointed him Lord President of the Council and Leader of the House of Lords. Lord Whitelaw faced many challenges in attempting to manage the House of Lords, facing a major defeat over abolition of the Greater London Council within a year of taking over. However, his patrician and moderate style appealed to Conservative peers and his tenure is considered a success.

During his period as her deputy and as Leader of the Lords, Thatcher relied on Whitelaw heavily; she famously announced that "every prime minister needs a Willie". He chaired the "star chamber" committee that settled the annual disputes between the limited resources made available by Treasury and the spending demands of other government departments. It was Whitelaw, in November 1980, who managed to dissuade Thatcher from going to Leeds to take charge of the Yorkshire Ripper investigation personally.

Resignation
Following a stroke in December 1987, he felt he had no choice but to resign. Nicholas Ridley argued that Whitelaw's retirement marked the beginning of the end of the Thatcher premiership, as he was no longer around as often to give sensible advice and to moderate her stance on issues, or to maintain a consensus of support in her own Cabinet and parliamentary party. He resigned from the Cabinet on 10 January 1988.

Retirement and death

During his retirement and until his death, Whitelaw was the chairman of the board of Governors at St Bees School, Cumbria. He was appointed a Knight of the Thistle in 1990. He formally resigned as Deputy Leader of the Conservative Party in 1991; a farewell dinner was held in his honour on 7 August 1991.

After several years of declining health, Whitelaw died from natural causes at Ennim, his home in Blencow, on 1 July 1999, shortly after his 81st birthday. He had been married for 56 years to his wife, Celia, Viscountess Whitelaw, a philanthropist/charity worker and horticulturist who had been an ATS volunteer during the Second World War. The couple had four daughters. Although Whitelaw was given a hereditary peerage, the title became extinct on his death as his daughters were unable to inherit. His eldest daughter Susan married Nicholas Cunliffe-Lister, 3rd Earl of Swinton. His home for many years was the mansion of Ennim, just outside the village of Great Blencow near Penrith, Cumbria. He was buried at St. Andrew's Parish Church, Dacre, Cumbria. Whitelaw was an active freemason.

References

Further reading
 Moore, Charles. Margaret Thatcher: From Grantham to the Falklands (2013) 
 Whitelaw, William. The Whitelaw Memoirs (1989), a primary source

External links

Burke's Peerage
Obituary in The Guardian, 2 July 1999
 William Whitelaw, "The Whitelaw Memoirs", Aurum Press, London, 1989.
 
The Papers of Viscount Whitelaw of Penrith held at Churchill Archives Centre
British Army Officers 1939−1945

|-

|-

|-

|-

|-

|-

|-

|-

|-

|-

|-

|-

1918 births
1999 deaths
Alumni of Trinity College, Cambridge
Anglo-Scots
British Secretaries of State for Employment
Burials in Cumbria
Conservative Party (UK) MPs for English constituencies
Cumbria MPs
Deputy Lieutenants of Dunbartonshire
Deputy Prime Ministers of the United Kingdom
Knights of the Thistle
Leaders of the House of Commons of the United Kingdom
Leaders of the House of Lords
Lord Presidents of the Council
Members of the Privy Council of the United Kingdom
People educated at Winchester College
People educated at Wixenford School
People from Nairn
People from Blencow
Recipients of the Military Cross
Scots Guards officers
Secretaries of State for Northern Ireland
Secretaries of State for the Home Department
UK MPs 1955–1959
UK MPs 1959–1964
UK MPs 1964–1966
UK MPs 1966–1970
UK MPs 1970–1974
UK MPs 1974
UK MPs 1974–1979
UK MPs 1979–1983
UK MPs 1983–1987
UK MPs who were granted peerages
Viscounts in the Peerage of the United Kingdom
Chairmen of the Conservative Party (UK)
Scottish Freemasons
Freemasons of the United Grand Lodge of England
Ministers in the Macmillan and Douglas-Home governments, 1957–1964
British Army personnel of World War II
Viscounts created by Elizabeth II